Kavitha is an Indian film and television actress who predominantly works in Kannada and Tamil television series. She gained popularity in the Kannada television soap opera Lakshmi Baramma. She was appreciated for her debut in the Kannada films Srinivasa Kalyana and First Love.

Career 
Kavitha made her debut in acting with the popular Tamil television show Mahabharatham. Kavitha entered the Kannada television industry with Lakshmi Baramma, where she played the role of innocent village girl Lakshmi aka Lacchi aka Chinnu. After Kavitha's appearance in Lakshmi Baramma, she was recognized as "Chinnu", creating a buzz among the fans.

The actress has also acted in various Tamil soaps Neeli, Pandian stores and was recently seen in the popular soap Vidya Vinayaka which was aired in Zee Kannada. However, She left Pandian Stores and was replaced by Hema Rajkumar because she went to Bigg Boss Kannada 6.

She acted in the films Srinivasa Kalyana (2016) and First Love (2017).

She participated in the Bigg Boss Kannada season 6, and she was the only female finalist to have completed 100 days journey in the glass house.

She then participated in Thaka Dimi Tha Dancing Star, a dancing reality show on Colors Kannada but was eliminated in the semi-finale round.

Filmography

Films

Television

References

External links
 

1992 births
21st-century Indian actresses
Living people
Bigg Boss Kannada contestants